Dendryphantes aethiopicus is a jumping spider species that lives in Ethiopia. It was first described in 2008.

References

Salticidae
Spiders of Africa
Arthropods of Ethiopia
Endemic fauna of Ethiopia
Spiders described in 2008
Taxa named by Wanda Wesołowska